Duke of Devonshire is an apple cultivar originating from Lancashire.

Description
This is a medium-sized (69 x 56 mm), roundish-ovate apple with a slight brownish flush. Its surface is veined with russet. The stalk is extremely short and stout. It was raised at Holker Hall, Lancashire in 1835, and introduced in 1875. It is picked in October.

References

Malus
Apple cultivars
British apples
Lancashire